John "Jack" Shearer  (30 December 1926 – 12 January 2001) was a Church of Ireland clergyman and the Dean of Belfast cathedral.

Life
He was born in Belfast and educated at Belfast Technical High School before studying at Trinity College, Dublin, where he graduated in 1950.

He was ordained in 1950. After two years in Magheralin Parish, County Down he served for seven years in St Patrick's Parish, Ballymacarrett, before becoming rector of Magheradoll, Ballynahinch. He then became Rector of Seagoe from 1964 to 1985, becoming Archdeacon of Dromore in 1970. He was appointed Dean of Belfast in 1985.

As dean he worked with his Roman Catholic opposite number to organise combined community services and other bridge building activities. He continued the tradition of the "Black Santa", holding "sitouts" during the Christmas period which raised millions of pounds for charity and in 1993 was awarded the OBE for services to the community. During his time as dean he oversaw the major reorganisation of the Cathedral precincts, the provision of facilities at the West Front for physically challenged persons and dedicated the "Patience", "Faith" and "Charity" stained glass windows.

He died in post in 2001. He had married Morag Williamson and left two children.

References

External links
Jack Shearer obituary

1926 births
2001 deaths
Alumni of Trinity College Dublin
Deans of Belfast
Officers of the Order of the British Empire
Irish Anglicans
Archdeacons of Dromore